John van Buskirk (born April 13, 1972) is an American soccer coach and a former player.

Playing career
Van Buskirk was a standout for his high school team in Granite City where he won two state championships, was selected to the All State IHSA team, a Gatorade All American and the team captain during his senior year. After high school, John went to play for Indiana University. With Indiana, his team reached the #1 overall ranking in the country and played in a national championship.

He went on to play 12 years of professional soccer in Germany. He made appearances in Bundesliga, 2. Bundesliga, and German Regionalliga. Buskirk was the team captain of Sportfreunde Siegen in the 2. Bundesliga for three years. He made a total of 272 professional soccer appearances in Germany and scored 63 goals total.

Coaching career
As a coach, Van Buskirk holds a Union of European Football Associations (UEFA) international C License. His professional coaching career includes Kickers Emden (2006–07) and he was an assistant coach for AC St. Louis until the team folded in 2010. John's college coaching career includes Men's head coach at Mckendree University (2013–2016) and an assistant coach at the University of Missouri-St. Louis (UMSL) from 2011–2013. Currently, he is the Director of Coaching and Player Development at Glen-Ed Soccer Club in Edwardsville, IL.

References

External links
 

1972 births
Living people
American soccer players
Association football forwards
American soccer coaches
KFC Uerdingen 05 players
Rot Weiss Ahlen players
Sportfreunde Siegen players
FC Rot-Weiß Erfurt players
Kickers Emden players
Bundesliga players
2. Bundesliga players
American people of Dutch descent
American expatriate soccer players
American expatriate soccer players in Germany
Indiana Hoosiers men's soccer players